Wild and Wonderful is a 1964 comedy film directed by Michael Anderson and starring Tony Curtis and Christine Kaufmann.  The screenplay concerns a clever French poodle named Monsieur Cognac, and the dog's effect on the newly married couple portrayed by Curtis and Kaufmann.<ref>"'Wild and Wonderful' is Wild and Wacky Fun", Boxoffice reprinted in Evening Independent, June 4, 1964.</ref>  The film was Curtis's last under his long contractual relationship with Universal Studios.

Plot
"Monsieur Cognac" is a white male poodle, a television and advertising star of 1960s Paris. The pampered pooch takes time out periodically by escaping his young mistress, Mademoiselle Giselle Ponchon, to roam the streets of Paris by night.

At a jazz bar American Terry Williams is performing with his combo. Monsieur Cognac takes a sip of the eponymous beverage from one of the musician's cups, but is really there to see the pretty female poodles appearing on the program. He teams up with Terry on a pub crawl, gets drunk - and accidentally turns green. Terry meets Giselle, Monsieur Cognac's owner, the following morning, when she, her father and the police storm Terry's apartment to arrest him for dog-napping.

Soon Terry and Giselle fall in love and even get married - much to the dismay of Giselle's father and Monsieur Cognac; the dog is jealous and tries to get rid of Terry. To have some peace and quiet on the wedding night at least, Terry pours a powdered sleeping pill into Monsieur Cognac's champagne glass. But the dog smells the ruse and switches glasses on Terry, who falls asleep on the wedding night!  Next day Terry tries to make peace with a private "handshake", but the wily dog squeaks so loudly that Giselle, her father and her uncle rush into the room, assuming that Terry has hurt the dog.

Although Giselle ultimately catches on to Cognac's 'injured' act everyone else is duped, and the couple are driven apart when Terry walks out. Visiting his musician friends, Terry suddenly realizes that Monsieur Cognac is missing a Madame Cognac – and sets about to introduce him to Madam Poupée, a lovely white female poodle who appears at the jazz bar; Terry “borrows” her to smuggle onto the set where Giselle is recording a TV show with Monsieur Cognac. When Poupée's owner appears and accuses those present of kidnapping her, the poodles run riot.  All ends well when Terry and Giselle finally kiss – in front of the TV camera.

Cast
 Tony Curtis as Terry Williams
 Christine Kaufmann as Giselle Ponchon
 Larry Storch as Rufus Gibbs
 Pierre Olaf as Jacquot
 Marty Ingels as Doc Bailey
 Jacques Aubuchon as Papa Ponchon
 Sarah Marshall as Pamela
 Marcel Dalio as Dr. Reynard
 Jules Munshin as Rousseleau
 Marcel Hillaire as Inspector Duviver
 Cliff Osmond as Hercule
 Fifi D'Orsay as Simone
 Vito Scotti as Andre
 Steven Geray as Bartender
 Stanley Adams as Mayor of Man La Loquet

Reception
The film had six credited writers, including Waldo Salt, who was then still working his way back from years on the Hollywood blacklist and who reportedly "hated" the film. In his 1999 obituary for Larry Markes, another of the credited writers,  Dick Vosburgh of The Independent commented, "Critics found it hard to accept that it had taken six writers to fashion the wafer-thin tale of a jazz flautist whose marriage to a French film star is threatened by the jealous tricks of Monsieur Cognac, her neurotic, alcoholic French poodle." In his obituary for Tony Curtis in 2010, film critic Dave Kehr dismissed the film as "disastrous," noting that Curtis was rebuilding his reputation after an earlier affair with Kaufmann, his co-star in Wild and Wonderful'', and subsequent divorce from Janet Leigh.

See also
List of American films of 1964

References

External links
 
 

1964 films
1964 comedy films
American comedy films
Films about dogs
Films based on short fiction
Films set in Paris
Universal Pictures films
Films with screenplays by Waldo Salt
Films produced by Harold Hecht
Films directed by Michael Anderson
1960s English-language films
1960s American films